Alexander Wood was a Scottish professional footballer who played as an inside forward in the Scottish League for Airdrieonians.

Career 
An inside forward, Wood began his career with high-flying Scottish League First Division club Airdrieonians and spent four years with the club. Wood moved to England to sign for Third Division South club Brentford prior to the beginning of the 1928–29 season. He had to wait until 23 February 1929 for his only appearance, filling in for the injured Jack Lane in a 1–1 draw with Northampton Town. He departed the Bees at the end of the season and had abortive spells at Second Division club Charlton Athletic and Third Division South club Fulham.

Career statistics

References

Date of death missing
Footballers from Glasgow
Scottish footballers
Association football inside forwards
Brentford F.C. players
English Football League players
1906 births
Airdrieonians F.C. (1878) players
Charlton Athletic F.C. players
Fulham F.C. players
Albion Rovers F.C. players
Year of death missing
Scottish Football League players